Schistophleps minor is a moth in the subfamily Arctiinae. It was described by Roepke in 1946. It is found on Sulawesi.

References

Natural History Museum Lepidoptera generic names catalog

Moths described in 1946
Nudariina